The AGM-76 Falcon was an air-to-surface anti-radiation missile developed by the United States Air Force during the Vietnam War. Intended as a conversion using off-the-shelf parts, it did not go into operational service.

Overview
During 1966, the United States Air Force began development of a heavy anti-radiation missile for use against surface-to-air missile radars in Vietnam. Using existing airframes from the cancelled AIM-47 Falcon heavy air-to-air missile project combined with the seeker head of the AGM-45 Shrike anti-radiation missile, the AGM-76A was fitted with a  warhead of the type used in the Mark 81 bomb. Test-firings of AGM-76As were conducted from McDonnell F-4D Phantom II, Republic F-105F Thunderchief, and US Navy Grumman A-6B Intruder aircraft, however the missile was not put into production, the AGM-45 and AGM-78 Standard ARM becoming the standard anti-radiation missiles used by the United States.

Operators
 : The United States Air Force cancelled the AGM-76 prior to service entry.

References

Cold War air-to-surface missiles of the United States
Anti-radiation missiles of the United States
Abandoned military rocket and missile projects of the United States